Kraig Kinser (born October 8, 1984) is an American professional racing driver. He was previously a developmental driver for MB2 Motorsports/Ginn Racing, and while with them, competed in both the NASCAR Craftsman Truck Series and the ARCA Re/Max Series between 2005 and 2007.

He is the son of the champion World of Outlaws sprint car racer Steve Kinser, as well as the fourth cousin of WoO competitor Mark Kinser.

Racing career
In 2005, he won the Knoxville Nationals, the most prestigious sprint car race in the world. The same year, he made his ARCA debut with Fast Track Racing in a partnership with MB2 Motorsports (the team he was a developmental driver for), and in just his second career start (which came at Talladega Superspeedway), he won a race.

In 2006, he started the season running full-time for Rookie of the Year in the Craftsman Truck Series, driving the No. 47 Chevrolet Silverado for Morgan-Dollar Motorsports. However, two races into the season, that truck changed numbers for the following two races to the No. 29, where Morgan-Dollar used K Automotive Racing's owner points to make the field. For the rest of the year after that, Kinser's truck used the No. 46. He was pulled from the ride in some races towards the end of the season, and now was sharing it with three Chevy Cup Series drivers: Clint Bowyer, Joe Nemechek, and Denny Hamlin. Also during that year, MB2 became Ginn Racing after a change in ownership. Kinser also returned to ARCA again for one race at Iowa, driving a No. 36 car for Ginn, where he would go on to finish second in that race.

He returned to the Truck Series in 2007, driving the No. 47 for Morgan-Dollar. He was originally slated to share this truck with fellow Ginn developmental driver Jesus Hernandez, but this never happened after Ginn merged with Dale Earnhardt Inc. mid-season, and Kinser was replaced by Regan Smith, meaning he did not complete the season for the second straight year.

In 2008, he was back running Sprint cars for Tony Stewart's prestigious team. He raced with them until the end of the 2009 World of Outlaws season. In 2010, he drove for his dad Steve Kinser's team with Quaker State sponsorship under the number 11K. For 2011, he drove the Casey's General Store Maxim for the Parsons Motorsports team.

As of July 6, 2017, Kraig has 17 World of Outlaw feature wins, placing him 24th all-time.

Motorsports career results

NASCAR
(key) (Bold – Pole position awarded by qualifying time. Italics – Pole position earned by points standings or practice time. * – Most laps led.)

Busch Series

Craftsman Truck Series

ARCA Re/Max Series
(key) (Bold – Pole position awarded by qualifying time. Italics – Pole position earned by points standings or practice time. * – Most laps led.)

External links
  (Broken link)
 

1984 births
ARCA Menards Series drivers
Living people
NASCAR drivers
Sportspeople from Bloomington, Indiana
Racing drivers from Indiana
USAC Silver Crown Series drivers
World of Outlaws drivers